Climate Action Tracker (CAT) is a research group with the aim of monitoring government action to achieve their reduction of greenhouse gas emissions with regard to international agreements. It is tracking climate action in 32 countries responsible for over 80% of global emissions.

COP26 

Toward the end of the COP26 climate conference, CAT produced a report concluding that the current "wave of netzero emission goals [are] not matched by action on the ground" and that the world is likely headed for more than 2.4°C of warming by the end of the century.

References

External links 

 Climate Action Tracker website

Scientific organizations established in 2009
Greenhouse gas emissions